The  is a commuter electric multiple unit (EMU) train type operated by the private railway operator Hanshin Electric Railway in Japan since 2007.

Design
The design was based on the earlier 9000 series trains, formed as six- and two-car sets. The motored cars are mounted on SS171M bogies, and the non-powered trailer cars use SS171T bogies.

Operations
The 1000 series sets are used on through-running services over Kintetsu lines, and are able to operate in multiple with 9000 series trains, running as up to 10-car formations.

Formations
, the fleet consists of thirteen six-car sets, numbered 1201 to 1213, and nine two-car sets, numbered 1501 to 1509.

6-car sets
The thirteen six-car sets are formed as shown below, with three motored "M" cars and three non-powered trailer "T" cars.

Each motored car is fitted with one PT7160-A single-arm pantograph.

2-car sets
The nine two-car sets are formed as shown below, with one motored "M" car and one non-powered trailer "T" car.

The motored cars are fitted with two PT7160-A single-arm pantographs.

Interior
Passenger accommodation consists of longitudinal bench seating throughout, with sculpted seats finished in olive green moquette.

History
The first train entered revenue service on 5 October 2007.

References

External links

 Hanshin 1000 series official information
 Hanshin 1000 series (Japan Railfan Magazine Online) 

Electric multiple units of Japan
1000 series
Kinki Sharyo multiple units
1500 V DC multiple units of Japan